Threeding is an online 3D printing marketplace and community for trading and free exchange of files ready for 3D printing. The website gives sellers personal storefronts where they list their 3D-printable models, and make them available for a global audience. Threeding is one of several 3D files repositories that have emerged with the fast-growing 3D printing industry.

History 

Threeding was started in 2013 by a group of students from the Bulgarian National Academy of Arts. Significant parts of the 3D objects available at Threeding are digital copies of historical artifacts. Several Eastern European historical and archaeological museums have also opened stores and sold 3D printable models of their exhibits via Threeding.

Concept 

Threeding works in a manner similar to early eBay. In order to sell 3D printing models on Threeding, users register to create a storefront. Creating a store and uploading a product on Threeding is free, but the website charges a commission for each sale. The website does not charge anything for free sharing of 3D models. The website has integrated PayPal and the major credit cards.

3D printing of cultural heritage 

Several Eastern European historical and archaeological museums have signed cooperation agreements with Threeding and opened virtual stores. Threeding 3D scans museums' exhibits, and the museums sell the digital 3D scans through their virtual stores. The available 3D printing models are historical artifacts from the prehistoric period, ancient times, and medieval and modern history.

See also 
 3D printing marketplace
 3D printing
 3D modeling
 STL (file format)

References

External links 

 

3D printing websites
Online marketplaces of Bulgaria
3D printer companies
3D graphics art
Companies established in 2013